Betasyrphus is a genus of hoverfly.

Species
B. adligatus (Wiedemann, 1824)
B. cinereomaculatus (Hull, 1937)
B. claripennis (Loew, 1858)
B. eutaeniatus (Bezzi, 1915)
B. hirticeps (Loew, 1858)
B. inflaticornis (Bezzi, 1915)
B. intersectus (Wiedemann, 1824)
B. luci (Curran, 1938)
B. saundersi (Goot, 1964)
B. serarius (Wiedemann, 1830)
B. stuckenbergi (Keiser, 1971)

References

External links
 http://www.papua-insects.nl/insect%20orders/Diptera/Syrphoidea/Syrphoidea.htm

Diptera of Africa
Diptera of Asia
Diptera of Australasia
Syrphini
Hoverfly genera
Taxa named by Shōnen Matsumura